XEGAJ-AM is a radio station on 790 AM in Guadalajara, Jalisco. It is owned by Radio Fórmula and carries its news/talk programming.

History
XEGAJ received its concession on April 1, 1992. It was owned by Radio Color, S.A., a Radiorama subsidiary. It was sold to Radio Fórmula in 2000.

References

Radio stations in Guadalajara
Radio Fórmula